Heydekrug may refer to places in former East Prussia:
 Šilutė, now Lithuania, the site of Stalag Luft VI - a World War II German allied aircrew POW camp
Landkreis Heydekrug: Former district of East Prussia until 1945
 Places now in Kaliningrad Oblast, Russia, the sites of the Battle of Königsberg at the Vistula Lagoon to the west of Königsberg:
 Groß-Heydekrug (now Vzmorye)
 Klein-Heydekrug (probably Cherepanovo)

de:Heydekrug